Yasunori Kumada (born 18 March 1963) is a Japanese volleyball player. He competed in the men's tournament at the 1988 Summer Olympics.

References

External links
 

1963 births
Living people
Japanese men's volleyball players
Olympic volleyball players of Japan
Volleyball players at the 1988 Summer Olympics
Sportspeople from Kanagawa Prefecture
20th-century Japanese people
21st-century Japanese people